The San Giacomo Pass (Italian: Passo San Giacomo) is an Alpine pass connecting Switzerland and Italy. It connects Bedretto on its northern side (valley of Leventina) to Formazza on its southern side.

The pass is located between the Grieshorn (west) and the Marchhorn (east).

References

External links
San Giacomo Pass on Hikr

Mountain passes of Switzerland
Mountain passes of Italy
Mountain passes of the Alps
Mountain passes of Ticino
Lepontine Alps